The 2011 Nigerian Senate election in Cross River State was held on April 9, 2011, to elect members of the Nigerian Senate to represent Cross River State. Benedict Ayade representing Cross River North, Victor Ndoma-Egba representing Cross River Central and Bassey Otu representing Cross River South all won on the platform of Peoples Democratic Party.

Overview

Summary

Results

Cross River North 
Peoples Democratic Party candidate Benedict Ayade won the election, defeating other party candidates.

Cross River Central 
Peoples Democratic Party candidate Victor Ndoma-Egba won the election, defeating other party candidates.

Cross River South 
Peoples Democratic Party candidate Bassey Otu won the election, defeating party candidates.

References 

Cross River State Senate elections
Cross River State senatorial elections
Cross River State senatorial elections